Dharyala Sagna is a town in the Islamabad Capital Territory of Pakistan. It is located at 33° 22' N 73° 15' E with an altitude of 489 metres (1604 feet).

References 

Union councils of Islamabad Capital Territory